The IEEE Corporate Innovation Recognition was established by the IEEE Board of Directors in 1985.  This award is presented for outstanding and exemplary contributions by an industrial entity, governmental, or academic organization, or other corporate body.

Recipients of this award will receive a certificate and crystal sculpture.

Recipients 
Source

References

Corporate Innovation Recognition
IEEE awards
Awards established in 1985
1985 establishments in the United States